James Matthew Teng (born on February 3, 1998, in Marilao, Bulacan, Philippines), is a Filipino teen actor and model who rose to fame in the sixth season of StarStruck. He is currently seen and has a semi-exclusive contract on GMA Network.

Career and personal life 
Teng just graduated high school before joining StarStruck. He already works as a model. His list of hobbies includes guitar and basketball. He is the nephew of the Basketball Legend Alvin Teng and the cousin of Jeric Teng and Jeron Teng. He was eliminated on November 6, 2015, and came in eleventh place as the fourth avenger.

Filmography

References 

1998 births
Living people
Filipino male television actors
Filipino male dancers
Filipino male models
21st-century Filipino male actors
StarStruck (Philippine TV series) participants
Male actors from Bulacan
GMA Network personalities
Tagalog people